We Are the Champions is a children's game show that ran from 13 June 1973 to 25 July 1995. It was originally presented by Ron Pickering but, when he died in 1991, Gary Lineker, Linford Christie and Judy Simpson took over as presenter of the remaining one-off specials.

The programme was formatted around a traditional British school sports day, where children would compete in various athletics and swimming competitions. Each programme concluded with Pickering shouting to the children ""Away Y' Go" at which point they would all run and jump/dive into the swimming pool as the titles ran.

In March 2010, We Are the Champions was revived as part of the BBC's Sport Relief programming. It was hosted by Paddy McGuinness with team captains Tim Henman, Amir Khan, Dame Kelly Holmes and Mark Foster.

Transmissions

Series

Specials

References

External links
 Sport Relief Does We Are the Champions
 
 We Are the Champions at BFI
 

1970s British game shows
1980s British game shows
1990s British game shows
2010s British game shows
1970s British children's television series
1980s British children's television series
1990s British children's television series
2010s British children's television series
1973 British television series debuts
2010 British television series endings
Television series by BBC Studios
BBC children's television shows
BBC television game shows
Lost BBC episodes